V Rámci Oného is the first album by the Slovak punk rock/comedy rock band Horkýže Slíže, released in October 1997.

Track list

Personnel
 Peter Hrivňák (Kuko) – vocals, bass guitar
 Mário Sabo (Sabotér) – guitar, backing vocals
 Juraj Štefánik (Doktor) – guitar, backing vocals
 Martin Košovan (Košo) – drums

External links 
Horkýže Slíže official website

1997 albums
Horkýže Slíže albums